Alfarrábios is a historical novel by the Brazilian writer José de Alencar, first published in 1873. It is composed of three minor narratives: "O Garatuja", "O Ermitão da Glória" and "Alma de Lázaro".

Adaptations
"O Garatuja" was adapted into an opera by Ernst Mahle.

1873 Brazilian novels
Novels by José de Alencar
Portuguese-language novels